Eskilstuna United DFF is a football club from Eskilstuna, in Södermanland County, Sweden. The club was established in 2002 and was promoted into the Women's Premier Division (Damallsvenskan) for the first time in 2014.

The club play their home games at Tunavallen in Eskilstuna. The team colours are blue and white. The club is affiliated to the Södermanlands Fotbollförbund.

History
Played in the first season (2013) of the newly created second level Elitettan and won the title. In its first top level season (2014 Damallsvenskan) the club finished seventh. In its second top season, they finished as runners-up and qualified to the 2016–17 UEFA Women's Champions League.

Eskilstuna United DFF lost the Swedish Women's Cup final, 0–3, to BK Häcken FF in May 2021.

On 5 December 2022, the Swedish Football Association announced that the club was denied for failing to fulfill economic requirements, and weren't allowed to play the 2023 Damallsvenskan and instead were relegated to Elitettan. The club appealed, but on 2 January 2023, the Swedish Football Association announced that instead, IK Uppsala would be promoted.

Current squad

Former players
For details of current and former players, see :Category:Eskilstuna United DFF players.

Honours
Elitettan (Tier 2)
Winners: 2013

Record in UEFA Women's Champions League
All results (away, home and aggregate) list Eskilstuna United's goal tally first.

a First leg.

Footnotes

External links
 Eskilstuna United DFF – Official website 

 
Women's football clubs in Sweden
Sport in Eskilstuna
2002 establishments in Sweden
Damallsvenskan teams
Association football clubs established in 2002